SM U-141 was a Type U 139 submarine serving in the Imperial German Navy in World War I. 
U-141 was engaged in the naval warfare and took part in the First Battle of the Atlantic.

References

Notes

Citations

Bibliography

World War I submarines of Germany
1918 ships
German Type U 139 submarines
U-boats commissioned in 1918
Ships built in Kiel